Daniel Zhechkov Genov (born 5 May 1985, in Targovishte) is a Bulgarian retired footballer who played as a defender.

References

External links

 footmercato profile

1985 births
Living people
People from Targovishte
Bulgarian footballers
First Professional Football League (Bulgaria) players
Second Professional Football League (Bulgaria) players
Neftochimic Burgas players
FC Pomorie players
PFC Svetkavitsa players
FC Lokomotiv 1929 Sofia players
PFC Belasitsa Petrich players
PFC Dobrudzha Dobrich players
FC Botev Vratsa players
PFC Spartak Pleven players
Association football midfielders